University of Maroua or Université de Maroua  is located  in Maroua, Cameroon. It was established in 2008.

References

External links
Official Website 
University of Maroua : President Paul BIYA keeps his promise
Cameroon University

Maroua
Educational institutions established in 2008
2008 establishments in Cameroon
Far North Region (Cameroon)